William Blackman or Blackmon may refer to: 
 William Blackman (cricketer) (1862–1885), English cricketer
 William Fremont Blackman (1855–1932), president of Rollins College
 Billy Blackman (1895–1969), Australian rules footballer
 William Haden Blackman, American video game designer and writer
 Will Blackmon (born 1984), American football player
 William Joshua Blackmon (1921–2010), American street preacher and Milwaukee artist